Manousakis is a Greek surname deriving from the name Manousos, a Cretan variant of Manolis. Notable people with the surname include:

Dimosthenis Manousakis (born 1981), Greek footballer
Manousos Manousakis (born 1950), Greek film director, producer, writer and actor

Greek-language surnames
Surnames
Patronymic surnames